Fry's Food and Drug is a chain of supermarkets that has a major presence in the U.S. state of Arizona. Fry's also operates under the banner of Fry's Marketplace, a combination of groceries and general merchandise comparable to a Walmart Supercenter. Fry's is a division of Cincinnati, Ohio-based Kroger.

History

Beginnings
Fry's was founded in 1954 by Donald Fry in northern California. With the help of his brother Charles, the chain expanded into the Phoenix market in 1960. Fry's was sold in 1972 to Dillons, based in Hutchinson, Kansas. (The sons of Charles Fry used the proceeds from the sale to launch Fry's Electronics in 1985; it was otherwise separate from and unaffiliated with the grocery chain.) Dillons merged with Kroger in 1983.

Fred Meyer and Kroger merger

In October 1998, Fred Meyer, parent company of Smith's Food and Drug based in Salt Lake City, announced a strategic merger with Kroger, based in Cincinnati. Several months later, in May 1999, the Federal Trade Commission (FTC) approved the merger of the two companies, named The Kroger Co..

Arizona and Texas were the only two of 31 states where there was an overlap of stores and brands from the merger. The Kroger Co., choosing to operate with one brand in the Arizona market, rebranded most Smith's Food & Drug Centers as Fry's Food & Drug Stores, though Smith's Food and Drug Centers in Kingman, Bullhead City, and Lake Havasu City remained unchanged (perhaps because of their proximity to Nevada and the Las Vegas market, where Kroger retained the Smith's brand). Fry's Phoenix Distribution Center and administrative offices were moved into the more modern Smith's Food and Drug Distribution Center and office space in the west Phoenix suburb of Tolleson.

Fry's Marketplace

Fry's Marketplace is a multi-department store that offers full-service grocery, pharmacy and general merchandise including outdoor living products, electronics, home goods and toys. The Marketplace format was derived from the Fred Meyer concept but on a smaller scale and has since expanded to other Kroger divisions (Ohio, Virginia, Texas, etc.), including the Smith's Food & Drug Centers Division in Utah.

Fry's Marketplace started out as Smitty's, Arizona's first multi-department store.  Smitty's was similar to a Wal-Mart Supercenter and even had a food court with four branded fast food options (such as Taco Bell). Smitty's notably carried the President's Choice brand. In 1996, Smitty's merged with Smith's Food and Drug Centers. In 1997, after the Fred Meyer–Smith's merger, Fred Meyer updated and revitalized the Smitty's concept and in January 1999, all Smitty's stores were renamed Fred Meyer.  During this time, management of the chain changed from Smith's Food and Drug to Fred Meyer. Construction also started on a full sized Fred Meyer store in Phoenix.

In June 2000, Kroger transferred the management of Fred Meyer's stores to Fry's Food and Drug. The Fred Meyer stores were rebranded as Fry's Marketplace, unifying the stores under the Fry's brand. The Fred Meyer store in Phoenix was completed but never opened and was later demolished as the store was too large for Fry's to use.

Fry's Signature
Fry's Signature is marketed as a high-end, neighborhood tailored grocery store. One of the locations is on 20427 North Hayden Road in Scottsdale. Another Fry's Signature store is located at 10450 N. 90th Street in Scottsdale. There is also a Fry's Signature store at the cross streets of Cave Creek Rd and Carefree Hwy in Cave Creek. In addition, there is a Fry's Signature Marketplace at the intersection of Shea Blvd and Tatum Blvd in Phoenix. There is another store located at the cross streets of Gavilan Peak Pkwy and Daisy Mountain Dr in the northern Phoenix suburb of Anthem.

Fry's Mercado
Fry's Mercado is geared towards Arizona's large Hispanic market.  It is located at 43rd Avenue and McDowell in Phoenix. There is a check cashing store, an agua fresca bar, a cocina (kitchen), and a gas station among other attractions at the location. Several other stores are sublet in the Fry's Mercado (including an electronics store, a women's clothing store, and a barber shop).

Fry's Fuel 
Fry's offers fuel at some of its retail locations.

References 

Companies based in Arizona
Retail companies established in 1954
1954 establishments in California
Kroger
Maricopa County, Arizona
Supermarkets of the United States
1960 establishments in Arizona
1972 mergers and acquisitions